Epidermidibacterium keratini is a Gram-positive, chemoheterotrophic, non-motile, non-sporeforming, rod-shaped, aerobic bacterium that it was first isolated from human epidermal keratinocytes in 2018. It is part of the normal human flora, typically the skin flora.

Bacteriology 
Human skin provides a habitat for various microorganisms that stably maintain communities through commensal relationships. And skin aging is associated with changes in cutaneous physiology including interactions with a skin microbial community. This strain was first isolated from young woman. Additionally, the younger skin appeared to have high proportion of E. keratini , while the older skin had no E. keratini but rather other types of bacteria that this species has been found to be related to skin aging.

References 

Actinomycetales